The 2015 Collingwood Football Club season was the club's 119th season of senior competition in the Australian Football League (AFL). The club also fielded its reserves team in the VFL.

Squad

 Players are listed by guernsey number, and 2015 statistics are for AFL regular season and finals series matches during the 2015 AFL season only. Career statistics include a player's complete AFL career, which, as a result, means that a player's debut and part or whole of their career statistics may be for another club. Statistics are correct as of Round 23 of the 2015 season (6 September 2015) and are taken from AFL Tables

Squad changes

In

Out

Season summary

Pre-season matches

Regular season

Ladder

Awards & Milestones

AFL Awards
 Anzac Medal – Paul Seedsman (Round 4)
 Player of the Round - Jamie Elliott (Round 9)
 2015 22under22 selection – Tom Langdon
 2015 22under22 selection – Brodie Grundy
 Captain of the AFL Coaches Association's 2015 All-Australian team (Interchange) – Scott Pendlebury

AFL Award Nominations
 Round 11 – 2015 AFL Rising Star nomination – Tim Broomhead
 Round 20 – 2015 AFL Rising Star nomination – Jordan De Goey
 2015 All-Australian team 40-man squad – Scott Pendlebury, Dane Swan

Club Awards
  – Scott Pendlebury
  – Dane Swan
  – Jack Crisp
  – Taylor Adams
  – Steele Sidebottom
  – Ben Moloney
  – Nathan Brown
  – Jordan De Goey
  – Jamie Elliott
  – Jack Crisp
 Magpie Army Player of the Year – Dane Swan

Milestones
 Round 1 – Jordan De Goey (AFL debut)
 Round 1 – Travis Varcoe (Collingwood debut)
 Round 1 – Jack Crisp (Collingwood debut)
 Round 1 – Steele Sidebottom (100 goals)
 Round 3 – Patrick Karnezis (Collingwood debut)
 Round 3 – Dane Swan (151 games at the MCG, most games at the home of football in the club's history.)
 Round 4 – Travis Cloke (400 goals)
 Round 6 – Jesse White (100 AFL goals)
 Round 7 – Nathan Brown (100 games)
 Round 8 – Scott Pendlebury (200 games)
 Round 8 – Taylor Adams (50 AFL games)
 Round 9 – Dane Swan (200 goals)
 Round 10 – Scott Pendlebury (50 games as skipper)
 Round 11 – Jesse White (100 AFL games)
 Round 11 – Nathan Buckley (50 wins)
 Round 14 – Darcy Moore (AFL debut)
 Round 14 – Brayden Maynard (AFL debut)
 Round 15 – Dane Swan (250 games)
 Round 16 – Levi Greenwood (Collingwood debut)
 Round 18 – Matthew Scharenberg (AFL debut)
 Round 19 – Ben Reid (100 games)
 Round 19 – Jonathon Marsh (AFL debut)
 Round 20 – Jamie Elliott (100 goals)
 Round 22 – Ben Sinclair (50 games)

VFL season

Pre-season matches

Regular season

Finals series

Ladder

Notes
 Key

 H ^ Home match.
 A ^ Away match.

 Notes
Collingwood's scores are indicated in bold font.

References

External links
 Official website of the Collingwood Football Club
 Official website of the Australian Football League

2015
Collingwood Football Club